Plattekill Creek is a  tributary of Esopus Creek in the Catskill Mountains in the U.S. state of New York. From its source on the southern slopes of Kaaterskill High Peak, it flows across Ulster and Greene counties to the Esopus at Mount Marion. The name is a Dutch word meaning "flat brook".

Plattekill Creek passes through the Platte Clove Preserve, which is a 208-acre nature preserve, that includes Plattekill Falls along with other waterfalls and also trails. The preserve is located in Platte Clove in the town of Hunter.

Recreation 
New York's Department of Environmental Conservation (DEC) regularly stocks fish in the creek to supplement the native population.

Hydrology 
New York's Department of Environmental Conservation (DEC) rates the water quality of Plattekill Creek in different sections. The lowermost section of the stream, from the mouth to Saugerties Reservoir in Blue Mountain, is rated Class B, suitable for primary and secondary contact recreation and fishing. The remaining section from the reservoir to the source has not been rated by the DEC.

References

Rivers of New York (state)
Rivers of Greene County, New York
Rivers of Ulster County, New York
Tributaries of the Hudson River